Faidh El Botma District is a district of Djelfa Province, Algeria.

Municipalities
The district is further divided into 3 municipalities:

Faidh El Botma
Amourah
Oum Laadham

Districts of Djelfa Province